The  ("Assault tank Upper Silesia" from , the assault;  the tank) was a German tank project of the First World War. It was a radical design for a fast-moving, lightly armoured assault tank.

The Oberschlesien included a track which was placed under the tank and only wrapped around half of it.

The tank featured such advanced features as the main armament mounted on top of the tank in a centrally placed revolving turret, separate fighting and engine compartments, a rear-mounted engine and a low track run.

History
Towards the end of the First World War it was clear that the only operational German tank, the A7V, was too expensive to produce and had too large a crew. Therefore, it was decided that a lighter tank was required which could spearhead assaults and which could be mass-produced.

Thirteen companies bid for the contract and in the middle of 1918, construction of a design by Captain Müller was assigned to the Oberschlesien Eisenwerk of Gleiwitz, which had partially completed two prototypes by October. The project received the pseudonym Oberschlesien (Upper Silesia).

Neither the ordered test models, nor the improved "Oberschlesien II" already planned were finished before the end of the war.

See also
 LK I

References

External links 
 Achtung Panzer! - First Panzers 1917 - 1918

World War I tanks
World War I tanks of Germany
Light tanks of Germany
History of the tank